The 2000–01 Boston College Eagles men's ice hockey season was the 79th season of play for the program. They represent Boston College in the 2000–01 NCAA Division I men's ice hockey season and for the 17th season in Hockey East. The Eagles were coached by Jerry York, in his 7th season, and played their home games at the Conte Forum.

Season

Milestone
Entering the season, head coach Jerry York needed just seven wins to reach 600 for his career. Early on, the team lived up to their pre-season ranking, winning four road games before heading into a showdown with Wisconsin. In a battle between the top two ranked programs, BC entered the third period with a lead, only to see the Badgers score twice to take the match. After a poor start from backup netminder Tim Kelleher, Scott Clemmensen finished the following game, allowing BC to get back on track. The next week, the Eagles returned to type, winning both games, and gave York his milestone.

Settling in
After a second consecutive poor showing from their backup, on November 7, BC turned over the net to Clemmenson for most of the rest of the season and got stellar play from the senior. In the team's 7–2 win over Merrimack, captain Brian Gionta set the program record for the fastest two goals when he scored 10 seconds apart in the third period. In the same game he recorded his 8th-career hat-trick, tying the program record, and hit 100 goals for his career, becoming the 4th player in program history to reach that mark. BC ended the first half of their season by taking down #11 Maine and establishing themselves as the #2 team in the nation, just behind Michigan State.

Missed opportunity
BC began the second half of the regular season with its second 2-vs-1 matchup. Just like the first time, the Eagles were unable to overcome the higher-seeded team and fell to MSU in the Great Lakes Invitational semifinal. Boston College retained its ranking after recovering with a win over #4 Michigan in the consolation game. A further loss to arch-rival Boston University dropped the team one spot but four consecutive wins over ranked teams had them back in the #2 spot before long. In the last game in January, Gionta again set new program records. By scoring 5 goals in the first, he set a Hockey East record for the most goals in one period. He tied the program record of 112 career goals while setting a new benchmark of 9 career hat-tricks. The game also marked the first season sweep of Maine since 1990.

Beanpot champions
After completing the season sweep of Massachusetts–Lowell, BC rode into the Beanpot tied in one poll for the #1 seed. The Eagles dropped Harvard in the semifinal, setting up a showdown with BU a week later. In the interim, however, BC saw its 6-game winning streak ended by Providence. Having lost yet another shot at being the top team in the nation, Boston College took out their frustrations out on the Terriers and won the Beanpot for the first time in seven years. Clemmenson was named tournament MVP.

Down the stretch
The Eagles split the following weekend against #8 New Hampshire and then were not quite up to par a week later versus Massachusetts. Despite not losing either match, BC dropped to #3 in the polls but rebounded with two wins to end their regular season. Boston College ended atop the Hockey East standings with a 7-point margin. It was the first conference title for the Eagles in a decade.

Hockey East tournament
BC opened their postseason with Scott Clemmensen earning the program record 13th and final shutout of his college career against Merrimack. He continued his strong play, allowing 1 goal in each of the next two games, and sent BC to their 4th-consecutive conference title game. The team got a tougher fight from Providence, but Tony Voce led the way with two goals and BC won the Hockey East Championship. Despite being held off the scoresheet in the final, Chuck Kobasew was named as the Tournament MVP.

NCAA tournament
Entering the tournament as the #2 team in the nation, Boston College received the top eastern seed and a bye into the second round. Their first game came against Maine, the team that had knocked them out in 1999, and BC continued their dominance of the Black Bears in '01 with 3–1 victory. Entering their 4th-consecutive Frozen Four, the Eagles were faced with Michigan, the squad that had defeated them for the title in 1998, for the second time on the year. The seniors were able to get their revenge three-years in the making and took the game 4–2. 

BC reached the championship game for the second straight season and the third time in four years. The only team left in their path to the title was defending champion, North Dakota. The two teams fought to a scoreless draw after one period and BC took over in the second, beginning with a power play goal from Kobasew. Senior Mike Lephart got a second goal three minutes later and Scott Clemmensen kept UND off the board until late in the game. After BC took a penalty for too many men with less than 5 minutes to play, the Fighting Sioux pulled their goaltender and cut the lead in half. Wes Dorey ted the game with under a minute before the buzzer and sent the championship into overtime. Despite the sudden change in fortune, BC found their nerve in the extra session and sent 4 shots on goal in less than 5 minutes. The final of which, coming from the stick of Krys Kolanos, found the back of the net and game Boston College its first national championship in 52 years. BC also became just the 3rd national champion that played more games on the road than at home (1978 Boston University, 1994 Lake Superior State)

Kobasew was named Tournament MOP while Clemmensen set the NCAA record for most game played by a goaltender in a Frozen Four with seven.

Departures

Recruiting

Roster

Standings

Schedule and results

|-
!colspan=12 style=";" | Exhibition

|-
!colspan=12 style=";" | 

|-
!colspan=12 style=";" | Regular Season

|-
!colspan=11 style=";" | 

|-
!colspan=11 style=";" | 

|-
!colspan=11 style=";" | 

|- align="center" bgcolor="#e0e0e0"
|colspan=11|Boston College Won Series 2-0

|-
!colspan=11 style=";" |

2001 national championship

Scoring statistics

Goaltending statistics

Rankings

USCHO did not release a poll in week 23.

Awards and honors

Players drafted into the NHL

2001 NHL Entry Draft

† incoming freshman

References

Boston College Eagles men's ice hockey seasons
Boston College
Boston College
Boston College
Boston College
Boston College
Boston College
Boston College